China's Got Talent was a Chinese reality television series on Dragon TV and a part of the Got Talent franchise, hosted by Cheng Lei. It is a talent show that features all different kinds of performances of all ages competing for performing contract with FremantleMedia and Sony Music Entertainment.  The show is a joint production between FremantleMedia, Shanghai Media Group, Radio and TV Shanghai and Syco.

On January 17, 2011, DragonTV announced that series 2 of the show has been launched. DragonTV also announced that there will be two series of the show in 2011.

Selection process

Pre-auditions process
Before the auditions in front of the judges are held, there are separate untelevised producers' auditions which come to various provinces across China, some which will host the auditions held in malls, outside and inside small stages. (before July 19) (before July 22)  This round is held several months before the judges' audition in Shanghai that would also host the televised second round. Acts that have made it through the producers' audition will then audition in front of the judges and a live audience. For series 3, the pre-auditions were televised for the first time.

Audition process
The auditions take place in front of the judges and a live audience at Shanghai Concert Hall. At any time during the audition, the judges may show disapproval to the act by pressing a buzzer which lights a large red X on the stage. If all the judges press their buzzers, the act must end immediately. But sometimes the judges pressing X doesn't mean the judges do not like the performances or the act. It is a way to stop the performance as the judges had heard enough because China's Got Talent doesn't have the 90 seconds rule. Voting works on a best-of-three basis for series one through three. For series four, voting is based on best of four.

Series 1 (2010)

Series one auditions of China's Got Talent begun on 25 July 2010. For Series one, the winner has the chance to perform at Las Vegas for three months and be invited on Taiwanese pop singer Jolin Tsai's Myself World Tour as a guest performer. The judges were Zhou Libo, a Shanghainese stand-up comedian, Annie Yi, Taiwanese singer-actor and Gao Xiaosong, a mainland pop composer, made up the jury panel for the final rounds of "China's Got Talent." Series one concluded on October 10 and the winner was a disabled pianist named Liu Wei.
Zhang Fengxi has become popular for Chinese speakers outside, mainly due to her use of Chinese puns, unique delivery and deadpan humor in her acts written by her parents. Judge Zhou Libo joked with the audience that she will succeed him. Another contestant who went onto greater things was Zhong Chenle. In 2016, he debuted in the K-Pop group NCT, as part of the subunit NCT DREAM. He was also in NCT 2018 and in the group he is a leading vocalist and has maintained- if not even further improved- his singing capabilities.

According to China's Got Talent director Jin Lei, popular contestants from the show – including the season 1 winner armless pianist Liu Wei – will perform in Austria, Italy and France starting January of next year.

Series 2 (2011)

Series two auditions of China's Got Talent began on 1 May 2011. Gao Xiaosong was pulled over of drunk driving on May 9. He was replaced by Taiwanese music composer Antonio Chen  for a brief stint in the audition but Jerry Huang   was named temporary judge for the competition. On July 10, a popper, Zhuo Jun was named the winner. The runner up is Cai Hongping, a 55-year-old opera singer who changes the lyrics of popular pieces to be about the vegetables she sells.

Series 3 (2011–12)

Series 3 opened with a pre-show with especial guests such as finalist of the second season like Tian Ma and international artist like Daniela Anahí Bessia among others. The auditions premiered on 20 November 2011. It is the first time that the show televise the pre-audition process and top 14 selection process. The winner is Pan Qianqian, a female baritone singer.

Series 4 (2012–13)

Series 4 was held on 18 November 2012. In this series, there will be four judges instead of three. Series regular judges Jerry Huang, Gao Xiaosong, Annie Yi and new judges Dou Wentao, Xu Jinglei, Leon Lai and Yang Wei will be featured in the audition process. Contortionist, Wang Jungru beat out yo-yo specialist, Duan Zhimin in this series.

Series 5 (2013–14)

Series 5 began airing on 8 December 2013. The judges were Zhao Wei, Alec Su, Liu Ye and Wang Wei-chung.

Talent is...Coming (达人来了) and Talent's Night (达人春晚)
These series started airing before the start of Series 2 and 4. The show has been used to recap previous series' winners and notable contestants, before a new series airs.  It also feature new performances from previous series.

Series summary

References

External links
Official website (in Chinese)

 
Chinese television shows
Chinese reality television series
Television series by Fremantle (company)
2010 Chinese television series debuts
Chinese television series based on British television series